Sandy Run may refer to a location in the United States:

Sandy Run (Twin Creek), Ohio, site of Brubaker Covered Bridge
Sandy Run, Bedford County, Pennsylvania, an unincorporated community
Sandy Run, Luzerne County, Pennsylvania, an unincorporated community
Sandy Run (Wissahickon Creek), a stream in Pennsylvania
Sandy Run (West Virginia), a stream in Pennsylvania
Sandy Run Middle School, part of Upper Dublin School District
Sandy Run, South Carolina, an unincorporated community